Azerbaijan and Israel have engaged in close cooperation since 1992. Azerbaijan is one of the majority Muslim countries, alongside Turkey, Egypt, Bahrain, United Arab Emirates, Jordan, Sudan, Kosovo, Morocco, Albania, Gulf countries and the other former Soviet republics to develop bilateral strategic and economic relations with Israel. In President Ilham Aliyev's meeting with Israel Prime Minister Benjamin Netanyahu, Aliyev praised the active role of the Jewish community living in Azerbaijan in developing bilateral relations between the countries.

Background

On October 18, 1991, the declaration of the Parliament of Azerbaijan restored the country's independence, and in November 1991 Turkey became the first state to formally recognize it. On December 25, 1991, Israel formally recognized the independence of Azerbaijan, becoming one of the first states to do so, and established diplomatic relations with the country on April 7, 1992. During the Nagorno-Karabakh conflict between Armenia and Azerbaijan, Israel funded and provided weapons and artillery to Azerbaijan.

According to a 2009 U.S. diplomatic memo, made public through WikiLeaks, Azerbaijan's President Ilham Aliyev once compared his country's relationship with Israel to an iceberg: "Nine-tenths of it is below the surface."

Azerbaijan was visited by David Harris, executive director of the American Jewish Committee, in July 2010, shortly after the visit of Hillary Clinton to Baku. During the reception, Harris said Azerbaijan presented cultural, strategic and political importance.

Azerbaijan was visited by John Shapiro, executive director of the American Jewish Committee, in January 2017, shortly after the visit of Benjamin Netanyahu to Baku. During the reception, Shapiro said that constructive partnership between Azerbaijan, US and Israel has a big significance.

Visiting Azerbaijan in December 2016 the Israeli, Prime Minister Benjamin Netanyahu said: "Relations with Azerbaijan are very close. They will be even better after this visit."

Azerbaijan is home to some 30,000 Jews, residing primarily in Baku and the Qırmızı Qəsəbə settlement in the Quba district of Azerbaijan. Mountain Jews have been living in Azerbaijan for close to 1,500 years; they are the descendants of Persian Jews. During the conquest by the Islamic Caliphate, Arabs settled an allied Jewish tribe in the neighborhoods of Baku; in 1730, Jews were officially allowed the right of residence and property ownership rights in Quba. There are also nearly 5,000 Ashkenazi Jews living mostly in Baku. The first Jewish Sochnut school in the Soviet Union was opened in 1982 in Baku, then capital of Azerbaijan SSR.

April 2017 marked the 25th anniversary of the establishment of diplomatic ties between Israel and Azerbaijan. A congratulatory letter to the President of Azerbaijan Ilham Aliyev from the Israeli Prime Minister Benjamin Netanyahu included:Israel is proud to have been one of the first nations to recognize the independent Republic of Azerbaijan. In the quarter-century since, our countries have built a solid relationship based on genuine friendship between the Jewish and Azerbaijani peoples. ... Azerbaijan is a model of inter-faith and multicultural harmony in an area fraught with religious and ethnic rivalries. Like you, Israel is a beacon of stability and tolerance in an unstable region. Despite the challenges we face, we have both succeeded in creating thriving economies and vibrant, prosperous and peace-seeking societies.Israeli–Azerbaijani ties strengthened since the very early 1990s. The strategic relationship included cooperation in trade and security matters, cultural and educational exchanges, etc. Relations entered a new phase in August 1997 during the visit of the then Israeli prime minister Benjamin Netanyahu to Baku. Since then Israel has been developing closer ties with Azerbaijan and has helped modernize the Armed Forces of Azerbaijan. The Israeli military has been a major provider of battlefield aviation, artillery, anti-tank, and anti-infantry weaponry to Azerbaijan.

In 2009, Israeli President Shimon Peres made a visit to Azerbaijan where military relations were expanded further, with the Israeli company Aeronautics Defense Systems Ltd announcing it would build a factory in Baku.

In 2010, Azerbaijani President Ilham Aliyev issued a decree banning the issue of visas in the country's international airports; foreigners henceforth had to apply for visas at the nearest Azerbaijani consulate. Israel and Turkey were the only two countries whose citizens were unaffected by the new law.

In 2016, Israel's Defence Minister Avigdor Lieberman supported the position of Azerbaijan in the 2016 Nagorno-Karabakh conflict, calling it "absolutely justified". Furthermore, Lieberman held Armenia responsible for provoking the conflict in April 2016.

A delegation of the World Jewish Congress visited Azerbaijan in September 2016; during the talks with the Azerbaijani President Ilham Aliyev emphasis was put on "excellent" relations with Israel and the Jewish community.

In December 2016, Israeli Prime Minister Benjamin Netanyahu paid an official visit to Baku. During the visit he emphasized that "Israel and Azerbaijan enjoy an excellent relationship and warm friendship". During the visit Netanyahu visited the Alley of Martyrs and paid tribute to Azerbaijani heroes. He also visited the Ohr Avner Chabad Day School, met with the local Jewish community and gave a speech before students. Press statements made by the President of Azerbaijan Ilham Aliyev and the Israeli Prime Minister Benjamin Netanyahu also showed satisfaction with the bilateral cooperation of the two countries.

In December 2016, the Azerbaijan-Israel intergovernmental agreement on air communication was signed.

In March 2017, several regional tours were made by the Israeli envoy to Azerbaijan to deepen economic cooperation in the spheres of economy, agriculture, and tourism: Azerbaijan and Israel abolished double taxation between the two countries in April 2017.

During his speech at the 72nd session of the UN General Assembly on September 19, 2017, Netanyahu mentioned the expansion of cooperation between the two countries.

In January 2019, the State Border Service of Azerbaijan purchased Sky Striker kamikazes from Israel's Elbit Systems. Azerbaijan became the first foreign buyer of Sky Strikers.

Recent developments
In the September 2020 Nagorno-Karabakh war with Armenia, Azerbaijan has deployed Israeli-made weapons on Armenian targets, and Israel continues to back Azerbaijan in its decades-long territorial dispute with Armenia.

Security relations
Following an October 2001 meeting with Israeli ambassador Eitan Naeh, Azerbaijan's then-president Heydar Aliyev declared that the two countries had identical positions in the fight against international terrorism. Israeli intelligence helps collect human intelligence about what they view as extremist organizations in the region. One of the groups, Hizb ut-Tahrir, which seeks the annihilation of the state of Israel, threatens both Jerusalem and Baku. Hizb ut-Tahrir is suspected of having several hundred members in Azerbaijan, and several its members were arrested and prosecuted by Azerbaijani authorities.

In 2008, a plot was foiled to bomb the Israeli Embassy in Baku, which is located in a high-rise building along with the Thai and Japanese embassies. Two Hezbollah militants went on trial for the attempt in May 2009. Local police narrowly averted the potential disaster, which involved placing three or four car bombs around the high-rise complex to carry out the attack. Groups planned the bombing in retaliation for the 2008 assassination in Damascus, Syria of Hezbollah's second in command Imad Mughniyah, which the Lebanese group blamed on Israel. News reports suggested Iran was involved in the plan as well.

In 2012, Israel and Azerbaijan signed an agreement according to which state-run Israel Aerospace Industries would sell $1.6 billion in drones and anti-aircraft and missile defense systems to Azerbaijan.

Some analysts consider that both Israel and Azerbaijan see Iran as an existential threat. Azerbaijan fears Iranian Islamist influence, but Iran fears Azerbaijan, too, as up to 18 million Iranians are ethnic Azeris. On the other hand, Azerbaijan has close links with Turkey, and the post-2006 worsening of Israel–Turkey relations may have repercussions on Azerbaijan's relations with Israel.

In February 2012, Iran rebuked Azerbaijan for allegedly aiding anti-Iranian activities by Israel's Mossad intelligence agency. A few weeks later Azerbaijan arrested 22 people in a suspected Iranian plot against Israeli and US targets in Azerbaijan. In March 2012, the magazine Foreign Policy reported that the Israeli Air Force may be preparing to use the Sitalchay Military Airbase, located 500 km (340 miles) from the Iranian border, for air strikes against the nuclear program of Iran.

Azerbaijan has sought closer relations with the West. There are, however, several inhibiting factors to a more proximate alliance. One is Russia. Another is Azerbaijan's vulnerability to pressure from the Muslim world. This pressure is the reason Azerbaijan has yet to open an embassy in Israel and why it has voted against Israel's views in international forums.

Trade relations
Economic cooperation between Israel and Azerbaijan has been growing significantly. As Azerbaijan deregulated its industries and liberalized its economy in the early 1990s, Israeli companies penetrated Azerbaijani markets. Many companies have invested in service industry. One example is Bezeq, a major Israeli telecommunication provider. Through a trade contract bid in 1994, Bezeq bought a large share of the telephone operating system. Today it installs phone lines and operates regional services throughout much of the country. Another company, Bakcell, was commenced as a joint venture between the Ministry of Communication of Azerbaijan and GTIB (Israel) in early 1994 as the first cellular telephone operator in the country. Dozens of Israeli companies are active in the Azerbaijani energy sector. For instance, Modcon Systems Ltd., an Israel-based supplier of high technology to the oil and gas industries, opened a branch in Azerbaijan. In March 2021, Israeli defense company Meteor Aerospace teamed up with Caspian Ship Building Company (CSBC) of Azerbaijan to jointly offer advanced defense solutions to meet the Eurasian country's national needs.

Between 2000 and 2005, Israel has risen from being Azerbaijan's tenth largest trading partner to its fifth. According to U.N. statistics, between 1997 and 2004, exports from Azerbaijan to Israel increased from barely over US$2 million to $323 million, fueled in recent years by the high price of oil. As of 2013, 40 percent of oil to Israel is exported from Baku, which makes Azerbaijan Israel's largest oil supplier.

Azerbaijan and Israel abolished double taxation between countries in April 2017. "Defense and energy sectors apart, the bilateral trade between the two countries amounted to $260 million in 2016," said the Israeli ambassador to Azerbaijan. According to the State Customs Committee of Azerbaijan, the total trade turnover between Azerbaijan and Israel amounted to $116.2 million in January–February 2017, which is 17.5 percent more compared to the same period of 2016.

In 2020 trade between Azerbaijan and Israel was approximately 200 million US dollars (beside oil supplies).

On July 29, 2021 Trade and Tourism representative office of Azerbaijan was founded in Tel Aviv.

Energy
Azerbaijan and Israel cooperate closely in the field of energy: Israel buys 40 percent of its oil from Azerbaijan. 

In a 2007 speech, the Israeli ambassador to Azerbaijan, Arthur Lenk, spoke of continuous trade between Azerbaijan and Israel in the energy sector. He noted that until the inauguration of the Baku–Tbilisi–Ceyhan pipeline in 2006, Israel was a key consumer of Azerbaijani oil exports and that the proximity of Ceyhan to Israel offers excellent new opportunities for greater Israeli participation in this sector of the economy, thus creating additional areas for collaboration and mutual benefit. He underlined that through the Trans-Israel pipeline between Ashkelon and Eilat, Israel could be a strategic partner for marketing Caspian oil to Asia. Israeli efforts in developing alternative energy resources, especially solar energy, were also mentioned. Israel additionally seeks possibilities of importing gas from the Caspian Sea region.

In December 2016, during his visit to Azerbaijan the Prime Minister of Israel Benjamin Netanyahu said: "Today we are negotiating not only for the supply of Azerbaijani oil, but also imports of Azerbaijani gas to Israel".

Cooperation against Iran

On March 29, 2012, officials stated that Israel was granted access to air bases in Azerbaijan through a "series of quiet political and military understandings." According to Haaretz, these airbases could potentially be used in a strike against Iran over its nuclear program and other tensions with Iran, and would be allowed by Azerbaijan. Israeli and Azerbaijani officials denied these reports.

On September 30, 2012, it was reported that Azerbaijan and Israel jointly examined the use of Azerbaijani air bases and spy drones to help Israeli jets perform a long-range strike on Iran. This would help Israel with regard to issues with refueling, reconnaissance, and rescuing crews, and could make an attack more feasible. The plan apparently involves using an Israeli tanker aircraft painted in the colors of a third country airline company that would land and refuel in Azerbaijan and then refuel the Israeli strike aircraft.

Israeli arms exports to Azerbaijan

Israel is an important exporter of arms to Azerbaijan: according to research of the Stockholm International Peace Research Institute, Israel accounted for 27 percent of Azerbaijan’s major arms imports from 2011 to 2020 and from 2016 to 2020, Israel accounted for 69 percent of Azerbaijan’s major arms imports.

See also

 Foreign relations of Azerbaijan 
 Foreign relations of Israel
 History of the Jews in Azerbaijan
 Qırmızı Qəsəbə
 Rafael Harpaz
 International recognition of Israel
 Azerbaijan–Palestine relations
 Israel–Turkey relations

References

Further reading

External links
"The Azeri Exception," Jewish Ideas Daily, by Aryeh Tepper 
 Celebrating 25 years of Azerbaijan-Israel Relations — The Jerusalem Post
 Israel and Azerbaijan: Celebrating 25 Years of Friendship — Jewish Journal

 
Israel
Bilateral relations of Israel